Jean-Luc Adenrele Ibrahim Koko Uddoh (born 1998), known by the stage name JyellowL (pronounced "J, yellow, L"), is an Irish rapper.

Early and personal life
Uddoh was born in Nigeria to a family of Nigerian and Afro-Jamaican ancestry. He lived with his father in Benin City before moving to Blanchardstown, Ireland aged 14 to live with his mother. He attended Luttrellstown Community College and The Institute of Education and studied for a politics degree at University College Dublin.

JyellowL lives in Newbridge, County Kildare. He was involved in organising Irish Black Lives Matter protests.

Career

JyellowL began performing in 2016, and performed at the 2018 Longitude Festival. He cites Fela Kuti, Damien Marley, Erykah Badu and 2Pac as influences.

JyellowL's music was featured in the video game FIFA 20 and on the TV show Normal People; he also appeared on BBC Three's Rap Trip. His 2020 debut album 2020 DIVision was nominated for the Choice Music Prize.

Discography
Studio albums
2020 D|Vision (2020)

EPs
Me n Me Too (2018)

References

External links

20th-century Irish people
21st-century Irish people
Alumni of University College Dublin
Irish people of Jamaican descent
Irish people of Nigerian descent
Irish rappers
1998 births
Living people
Musicians from Dublin (city)
Black Irish people